The Inge Lehmann Medal is given out by the American Geophysical Union to recognize "outstanding contributions to the understanding of the structure, composition, and dynamics of the Earth's mantle and core". The award was created in 1995 and named after seismologist Inge Lehmann who discovered Earth's inner core.

Past recipients
Source: American Geophysical Union
 1997 Donald Helmberger
 2000 Richard J. O'Connell
 2001 John H. Woodhouse
 2003 Francis Anthony Dahlen
 2005 Thomas H. Jordan
 2007 Ho-Kwang (Dave) Mao 
 2009 Barbara A. Romanowicz
 2011 Donald Weidner 
 2013 Bradford H. Hager
 2014 Thorne Lay
 2015 Peter Olson
 2016 Shun-ichiro Karato
 2017 Brian Kennett
 2018 Yoshio Fukao
 2019 Ulrich R. Christensen
 2020 Peter Shearer

See also
 List of geophysicists
 List of geophysics awards
 Prizes named after people

References

American Geophysical Union awards
Awards established in 1997